Shae Kelley is a professional women's basketball player who recently played for the Minnesota Lynx of the Women's National Basketball Association for the 2015 season. She signed with the team on August 11, 2015.

Old Dominion and Minnesota statistics
Source

WNBA career statistics

Regular season

|-
| style="text-align:left;background:#afe6ba;"| 2015†
| align="left" | Minnesota
| 8 || 0 || 2.4 || .000 || .000 || .500 || 0.4 || 0.1 || 0.1 || 0.0 || 0.1 || 0.1
|-
| align="left" | Career
| align="left" | 1 year, 1 team
| 8 || 0 || 2.4 || .000 || .000 || .500 || 0.4 || 0.1 || 0.1 || 0.0 || 0.1 || 0.1

Postseason

|-
| style="text-align:left;background:#afe6ba;"| 2015†
| align="left" | Minnesota
| 1 || 0 || 0.0 || .000 || .000 || .000 || 0.0 || 0.0 || 0.0 || 0.0 || 0.0 || 0.0
|-
| align="left" | Career
| align="left" | 1 year, 1 team
| 1 || 0 || 0.0 || .000 || .000 || .000 || 0.0 || 0.0 || 0.0 || 0.0 || 0.0 || 0.0

References

External links
Minnesota Golden Gophers profile 
Old Dominion Lady Monarchs profile

1991 births
Living people
American women's basketball players
Basketball players from Denver
Forwards (basketball)
Junior college women's basketball players in the United States
Minnesota Golden Gophers women's basketball players
Minnesota Lynx draft picks
Minnesota Lynx players
Northwest Florida State College alumni
Old Dominion Monarchs women's basketball players